The Cherniakhiv culture, Cherniakhiv culture or Sântana de Mureș—Cherniakhiv culture was an archaeological culture that flourished between the 2nd and 5th centuries CE in a wide area of Eastern Europe, specifically in what is now Ukraine, Romania, Moldova and parts of Belarus. The culture is thought to be the result of a multiethnic cultural mix of the Geto-Dacian , Sarmatian, and Gothic populations of the area. 
"In the past, the association of this [Cherniakhiv] culture with the Goths was highly contentious, but important methodological advances have made it irresistible."

The Cherniakhiv culture territorially replaced its predecessor, the Zarubintsy culture. Both cultures were discovered by the Czech-Ukrainian archaeologist, Vikentiy Khvoyka, who conducted numerous excavations around Kyiv and its vicinity. With the invasion of Huns, the culture declined and was replaced with the Penkovka culture (or the culture of the Antes).

Similarities have been noted between the Cherniakhiv culture and the Wielbark culture, which was located closer to the Baltic Sea.

Location and nomenclature 
The Chernyakhov culture encompassed regions of modern Ukraine, Moldova, and Romania. The spelling Chernyakhov is the transliteration from Russian for an archaeological site in the vicinity of Kyiv, modern Ukraine. Other spellings include Cherniakhiv (Ukrainian), Czerniachów (Polish), and several others. The culture has also been named after Sântana de Mureș, a cemetery site in Transylvania, Romania, spelled Sîntana de Mureș before 1993. This site is also known as Marosszentanna, the formerly official Hungarian name under which the first excavations took place. The dual name reflects past preferential use by different schools of history (Romanian and Soviet) to designate the culture.

Origins
In the earlier half of the 20th century, scholars spent much energy debating the ethnic affinity of people in the Cherniakhiv zone. Soviet scholars, such as Boris Rybakov, saw it as the archaeological reflection of the Proto-Slavs, but western, especially German, historians, and Polish archeologists attributed it to the Goths. According to Kazimierz Godłowski (1979), the origins of Slavic culture should be connected with the areas of the upper Dnieper basin (the Kyiv culture) while the Chernyakhov culture with the federation of the Goths. However, the remains of archaeologically visible material culture and their link with ethnic identity are not as clear as originally thought.

Today, scholars recognize the Cherniakhiv zone as representing a cultural interaction of a diversity of peoples, but predominantly those who already existed in the region, whether it be the Sarmatians, or the Getae-Dacians (some authors believe that the Getae-Dacians played the leading role in the creation of the culture).

Finds

Funerary rites
Both inhumation and cremation were practiced. The dead were buried with grave goods – pottery, iron implements, bone combs, personal ornaments, although in later periods grave goods decrease. Of the inhumation burials, the dead were usually buried in a north–south axis (with head to north), although a minority are in east–west orientation. Funerary gifts often include fibulae, belt buckles, bone combs, glass drinking vessels and other jewelry. Women's burials in particular shared very close similarities with Wielbark forms - buried with two fibulae, one on each shoulder. Like in the Wielbark culture, Chernyakhov burials usually lack weapons as funerary gifts, except in a few cremation burials reminiscent of Przeworsk influences. Although cremation burials are traditionally associated with Dacian, Germanic and Slavic peoples, and inhumation is suggestive of nomadic practice, careful analysis suggests that the mixed burials were of an earlier period, whilst toward the end there was a trend toward inhumation burials without grave goods. This could be the result of the influences of Christianity, but could just as easily be explained in terms of an evolution of non-Christian beliefs about the afterlife.

Ceramic wares

Pottery was predominantly of local production, being both wheel and hand-made. Wheel made pottery predominated, and was made of finer clay. It was reminiscent of earlier Sarmatian types, refined by Roman and La Tene influences. Hand made pottery showed a greater variety in form, and was sometimes decorated with incised linear motifs. In addition,  Roman amphorae are also found, suggesting trade contacts with the Roman world. There is also a small, but regular, presence of distinct hand–made pottery typical of that found in western Germanic groups, suggesting the presence of Germanic groups.

Economy
The Chernyakhov people were primarily a settled population involved in cultivation of cereals – especially wheat, barley and millet. Finds of ploughshares, sickles and scythes have been frequent. Cattle breeding was the primary mode of animal husbandry, and the breeding of horses appears to have been restricted to the open steppe. Metalworking skills were widespread throughout the culture, and local smiths produced much of the implements, although there is some evidence of production specialization.

Decline
The Chernyakhov culture ends in the 5th century, attributed to the arrival of the Huns. The collapse of the culture is no longer explained in terms of population displacement, although there was an outmigration of Goths. Rather, more recent theories explain the collapse of the Chernyakhov culture in terms of a disruption of the hierarchical political structure that maintained it. John Mathews suggests that, despite its cultural homogeneity, a sense of ethnic distinction was kept between the disparate peoples. Some of the autochthonous elements persist, and become even more widespread, after the demise of the Gothic elite – a phenomenon associated with the rise and expansion of the early Slavs.

Migration and diffusion theories

Migration
Whilst acknowledging the mixed origins of the Chernyakiv culture, Peter Heather suggests that the culture is ultimately a reflection of the Goths' domination of the Pontic area. He cites literary sources that attest that the Goths were the centre of political attention at this time. In particular, the culture's development corresponds well with Jordanes' tale of Gothic migration from Gothiscandza to Oium, under the leadership of Filimer. Moreover, he highlights that crucial external influences that catalysed Chernyakhov cultural development derived from the Wielbark culture. Originating in the mid-1st century, it spread from south of the Baltic Sea (from territory around later Pomerania) down the Vistula in the 2nd and 3rd centuries. Wielbark elements are prominent in the Chernyakhov zone, such as typical 'Germanic' pottery, brooch types and female costume, and, in particular, weaponless bi-ritual burials. Although cultures may spread without substantial population movements, Heather draws attention to a decrease in the number of settlements in the original Pomeranian Wielbark heartland as evidence of a significant population movement. Combined with Jordanes' account, Heather concludes that a movement of Goths (and other east Germanic groups such as Heruli and Gepids) "played a major role in the creation of the Cernjachove culture". He clarifies that this movement was not a single, royal-led, migration, but was rather accomplished by a series of small, sometimes mutually antagonistic groups.

Diffusion
However, Guy Halsall challenges some of Heather's conclusions. He sees no chronological development from the Wielbark to Chernyakhov culture, given that the latter stage of the Wielbark culture is synchronous with Chernyakhov, and the two regions have minimal territorial overlap. "Although it is often claimed that Cernjachov metalwork derives from Wielbark types, close examination reveals no more than a few types with general similarities to Wielbark types". Michael Kulikowski also challenges the Wielbark connection, highlighting that the greatest reason for Wielbark-Chernyakhov connection derives from a "negative characteristic" (i.e., the absence of weapons in burials), which is less convincing proof than a positive one. He argues that the Chernyakhov culture could just as likely have been an indigenous development of local Pontic, Carpic or Dacian cultures, or a blended culture resulting from Przeworsk and steppe interactions. Furthermore, he altogether denies the existence of Goths prior to the 3rd century. Kulikowski states that no Gothic people, nor even a noble kernel, migrated from Scandinavia or the Baltic. Rather, he suggests that the "Goths" formed in situ. Like the Alemanni or the Franks, the Goths were a "product of the Roman frontier".

Other influences, such as a minority of burials containing weapons, are seen from the Przeworsk and Zarubinec cultures. The latter has been connected with early Slavs.

Genetics
In 2019, a genetic study of various cultures of the Eurasian Steppe, including the Chernyakhov culture, was published in Current Biology. Out of 31 ancient individuals tested, 3 samples from three individuals which the authors identified with "Ukrainian post-Scythian Chernyakhiv culture" were analyzed. They "overlapped with modern Europeans, representing the most "western" range of variation among the groups of this study", with 64.8% of Yamnaya-like ancestry, "lacking the Altaian component entirely" and having "higher proportion" of Central European Middle Neolithic ancestry (35.2%) than historically earlier samples from the region. They suggest the culture was a multi-ethnic mix, but the samples "appear to represent its Gothic component". Their mtDNA haplogroups were H1n6, H1c and T2g1.

See also
 Oium
 Carpathian Tumuli culture

References

Sources

External links 
 Slavs in Antiquity, summary in English translation of a text by Valentin V. Sedov, originally in Russian (V. V. Sedov: "Slavyane v drevnosti", Moscow 1994).

2nd-century establishments
5th-century disestablishments
Archaeological cultures of Eastern Europe
Iron Age cultures of Europe
Archaeological cultures in Belarus
Archaeological cultures in Moldova
Archaeological cultures in Romania
Archaeological cultures in Ukraine
Slavic archaeological cultures
Germanic archaeological cultures
Goths
Migration Period
Roman Dacia
Moldova in the Early Middle Ages
Romania in the Early Middle Ages